Paducah, Kentucky formed from a mixed settlement of Native Americans and White Settlers along the confluence of the Tennessee River and Ohio River. The town was incorporated in 1830 and chartered as a city in 1856. The city is governed as a council–manager form of government whereby a directly elected mayor and directly elected city commissioners. The mayor is a ceremonial title, as the City Manager is appointed to oversee daily operations of the city. The following is a list of mayors of Paducah, Kentucky from the charter date thru to the present.

History of the office
The first election to take place under the Act of Incorporation took place in 1857 resulting in the first Mayor of Paducah, Jesse H. Gardner, taking the office. The office has been under direct election since its beginning and each incumbent resides in office for four (previously two) years before the next election.

Incorporated city
{| class="wikitable"
! Mayor !! Term Began !! Term Ended !! Political Party
|-
| Jesse H. Gardner || 1857 || 1859 || 
|-
| John W. Sauner || 1859 || 1863 || 
|-
| John G. Fisher || 1863 || 1867 || 
|- bgcolor="#ddeeff"
| John W. Sauner || 1867 || 1871 || 
|-
| Meyer Weil || 1871 || 1875 || 
|- bgcolor="#ddeeff"
| John G. Fisher || 1875 || 1877 || 
|- bgcolor="#ddeeff"
| Meyer Weil || 1877 || 1881 || 
|-
| Charles Reed || 1881 || 1889 || 
|-
| Joseph H. Johnson || 1889 || 1891 || 
|-
| David A. Yeiser, Sr. || 1891 || 1897 || 
|- 
| James M. Lang || 1897 || 1901 || Democrat
|-
| David A. Yeiser, Sr. || 1902 || 1907 || 
|-
| James P. Smith || 1908 || 1911 || Republican
|-
| Thomas N. Hazelip || 1912 || 1915 || Republican
|- bgcolor="#ddeeff"
| Ernest Lackey || 1916 || 1916 || Democrat
|- bgcolor="#ddeeff"
| Frank N. Burns || 1916 || 1919 || Democrat
|- bgcolor="#ddeeff"
| F. W. Katterjohn || 1920 || 1924 || Democrat
|- bgcolor="#ddeeff"
| Jacob N. Bailey || 1924 || 1928 || Democrat
|- bgcolor="#ddeeff"
| Ernest Lackey || 1928 || 1932 || Democrat
|- bgcolor="#ddeeff"
| Edward G. Scott || 1932 || 1936 || Democrat
|- bgcolor="#ddeeff"
| Edgar T. Washburn || 1936 || 1940 || Democrat
|- bgcolor="#ddeeff"
| Pierce E. Lackey || 1940 || 1944 || Democrat
|- bgcolor="#ddeeff"
| Wayne C. Seaton || 1944 || 1948 || Democrat
|- bgcolor="#ddeeff"
| Gene Peak || 1948 || 1949 || Democrat
|- bgcolor="#ddeeff"
| Stuart Johnston || 1949 || 1952 || Democrat
|- bgcolor="#ddeeff"
| Robert C. Cherry || 1952|| 1956 || Democrat
|- bgcolor="#ddeeff"
| George G. Jacobs || 1956 || 1960 || Democrat
|- bgcolor="#ffe8e8"
| Robert C. Cherry || 1960 || 1964 || Republican
|- bgcolor="#ffe8e8"
| Thomas W. Wilson || 1964 || 1968 || Republican
|- bgcolor="#ddeeff"
| Robert C. Cherry || 1968 || 1972 || Democrat 
|- bgcolor="#ddeeff"
| Dolly McNutt || 1972 || 1976 || Democrat 
|- bgcolor="#ddeeff"
| William S. Murphy || 1976 || 1980 || Democrat 
|- bgcolor="#ddeeff"
| John K. Penrod || 1980 || 1984 || Democrat 
|- bgcolor="#ffe8e8"
| Joe Viterisi || 1984 || 1988 || Republican
|- bgcolor="#ffe8e8"
| Gerry B. Montgomery || 1988 || 1996 || Republican 
|- bgcolor="#ddeeff"
| Albert Jones || 1996 || 2000 ||  Democrat
|- bgcolor="#ddeeff"
| William F. Paxton || 2000 || 2012 || Democrat
|- bgcolor="#ffe8e8"
| Gayle Kaler || 2012 || 2016 || Republican
|- bgcolor= "#ddeeff"
| Brandi Harless || 2016 ||   2020  || Democrat
|- bgcolor= "#ffe8e8"
| George Bray || 2020 ||         ||
Republican

Paducah